Jesús Casillas Romero (born 13 May 1962) is a Mexican politician affiliated with the PRI. He currently serves as Senator of the LXII Legislature of the Mexican Congress representing Jalisco, and previously served in the Congress of Jalisco.

References

1962 births
Living people
Institutional Revolutionary Party politicians
Members of the Senate of the Republic (Mexico) for Jalisco
21st-century Mexican politicians
Members of the Congress of Jalisco
University of Guadalajara alumni
Senators of the LXII and LXIII Legislatures of Mexico